AO Cassiopeiae, also known as Pearce's Star, is a binary system composed of an O8 main sequence star and an O9.2 bright giant that respectively weigh anywhere between 20.30 and 57.75 times and 14.8 and 31.73 times the mass of the Sun.

The AO Cas system is an eclipsing binary with a period of roughly 3.5 days, with the apparent magnitude ranging between 6.07 and 6.24. Stars of this brightness are generally just visible to the unaided eye in dark skies in semirural locations.  The component stars are so close to each other they are ellipsoidal (egg-shaped).  AO Cas is considered a contact binary, with both stars at or near their Roche lobes.

References

External links
 http://jumk.de/astronomie/special-stars/ao-cassiopeiae.shtml

Eclipsing binaries
Cassiopeia (constellation)
001337
Cassiopeiae, AO
0065
O-type bright giants
O-type main-sequence stars
001415
BD+50 0046
Emission-line stars